Colombo Commandos cricket team is one of the five provincial cricket teams which make up the Sri Lankan domestic cricket structure representing mainly three districts of Western Province, Sri Lanka, the Colombo District, the Gampaha District and the Kalutara district, and with some nearby provinces. In previous occasions, the province was divided into two halves as Basnahira North and Basnahira South, which was combined in this season as Colombo Commandos. The cricket team's first participation came during the Twenty20 competition known as the Inter-Provincial Twenty20 2016 season which was known as Super T20 Provincial Tournament.

The team plays their home matches in Colombo R. Premadasa Stadium, Sinhalese Sports Club Ground and Tyronne Fernando Stadium in Moratuwa. Milinda Siriwardene is the captain of the side. Shehan Jayasuriya, Shaminda Eranga and Niroshan Dickwella are some of the other notable current Test cricketers and Limited overs cricketers in the national side.

Colombo Commandos won the 2016 Super T20 Provincial Tournament by defeating Galle Guardians in the final.

Current squad
The squad for the 2015–16 season as of 26 January 2016.

||  || Milinda Siriwardene (c) ||  30 ||  All-rounder ||  LHB ||  LO
|-
||  || Dhananjaya de Silva ||  24 ||  Batsman ||  RHB ||  LOS
|-
||  || Niroshan Dickwella ||  22 ||  Wicket-keeper Batsman ||  LHB ||  
|-
||  || Shaminda Eranga ||  29 ||  Bolwer ||  RHB ||  RMF
|-
||  || Vishwa Fernando ||  24 ||  All-rounder ||  RHB ||  LMF
|-
||  || Upul Indrasiri ||  33 ||  Bowler ||  LHB ||  LO
|-
||  || Shehan Jayasuriya ||  24 ||  All-rounder ||  LHB ||  ROS
|-
||  || Shehen Jayawardene ||  32 ||  All-rounder ||  RHB ||  RFM
|-
||  || Lahiru Madushanka ||  23 ||  All-rounder ||  RHB ||  RFM
|-
||  || Ramesh Mendis ||  20 ||  All-rounder ||  RHB ||  ROS
|-
||  || Nadeera Nawela ||  31 ||  Batsman ||  RHB ||  RFM
|-
||  || Rashmika Opatha ||  18 ||  All-rounder ||  RHB ||  ROS
|-
||  || Kasun Rajitha ||  22 ||  All-rounder ||  RHB ||  RMF
|-
||  || Ramith Rambukwella ||  24 ||  Opening bastman ||  LHB ||  ROS
|-
||  || Lasanda Rukmal ||  25 ||  All-rounder ||  RHB ||  RMF
|-
||  || Sadeera Samarawickrama ||  20 ||  Wicket-keeper ||  RHB ||  
|-
||  || Dasun Shanaka ||  24 ||  All-rounder ||  RHB ||  RMF
|-
|}
|}

References

Provincial Twenty20 teams
Sport in Colombo
Cricket clubs established in 2016
Sports clubs in Sri Lanka
Cricket in Colombo